Buena Fe Canton is a canton in Los Ríos Province, Ecuador. Its capital is the town of Buena Fe.  Its population at the 2001 census was 47,361.

The history of this county dates back to 1943 when the purpose of settling in the area arrived and Mr. Medardo Rosa Espinoza Cabezas Figueroa Carrillo, who rented a villa in what is now the Las Vegas, where they set up shop which gave the name of Good Faith
Over the years the name became generic and others were soon built their homes in the surrounding areas gradually formed the village.
Having reached a relative development, by decree No. 174 of October 11, 1979 Buena Fe was built as a rural parish Quevedo Canton, to which it belonged until 1992, when a pro cantonization committee chaired by Mr. Gilberto Salinas got the Whole Standing Legislative Committees issued the decree in question, which after being signed by the President, Dr. Rodrigo Borja, was published in Official Gazette No. 995 of 7 August.
Earnest jurisdiction extends in a very fertile and rich, which has taken a big boost agro-industry, especially in the production of beef, cocoa, coffee, oil palm and fruit variety.
Buena Fe belong to the district rural parish Patricia Pilar and sections of San Francisco, Four Mangas, La Reserva, Fumisa, May 24, Glance, The Fourteen, Pechiche, Los Angeles and Zulema.

Demographics
Ethnic groups as of the Ecuadorian census of 2010:
Mestizo  67.7%
Montubio  18.1%
Afro-Ecuadorian  6.9%
White  6.7%
Indigenous  0.3%
Other  0.3%

References

Canton in the province of Los Ríos.
The history of this county dates back to 1943 when the purpose of settling in the area arrived and Mr. Medardo Rosa Espinoza Cabezas Figueroa Carrillo, who rented a villa in what is now the Las Vegas, where they set up shop which gave the name of Good Faith
Over the years the name became generic and others were soon built their homes in the surrounding areas gradually formed the village.
Having reached a relative development, by decree No. 174 of October 11, 1979 Buena Fe was built as a rural parish Quevedo Canton, to which it belonged until 1992, when a pro cantonization committee chaired by Mr. Gilberto Salinas got the Whole Standing Legislative Committees issued the decree in question, which after being signed by the President, Dr. Rodrigo Borja, was published in Official Gazette No. 995 of 7 August.
Earnest jurisdiction extends in a very fertile and rich, which has taken a big boost agro-industry, especially in the production of beef, cocoa, coffee, oil palm and fruit variety.
Buena Fe belong to the district rural parish Patricia Pilar and sections of San Francisco, Four Mangas, La Reserva, Fumisa, May 24, Glance, The Fourteen, Pechiche, Los Angeles and Zulema.

Cantons of Los Ríos Province